Meseta (Spanish for plateau) may refer to:

Geology 
A geological domain consisting of Mesa (plateau) type reliefs
Meseta Central ("Inner Plateau"), the high plains of central Spain
La Meseta Formation, a geological formation and major fossil site in Antarctica
Meseta (volcano), a partially collapsed volcanic vent of Volcán de Fuego in Guatemala
Moroccan Meseta Mountains, the orogenic belt of the Moroccan coastal block between the Atlantic Margin and the Middle Atlas

Other 
 Meseta, a fictional currency of the Phantasy Star video game series
Mesetas, a municipality in Colombia

See also
 
 Mesita (disambiguation)